Bristol Dragway is a 30,000 capacity drag racing circuit. It is located in Bristol, Tennessee, United States. The stadium is located close to the Bristol Motor Speedway.  It was originally built in 1965 and is often called "Thunder Valley" due to the acoustics created by its location between two mountains.  Its track is 3,800 feet long.

References

External links
Official website

Motorsport venues in Tennessee
Drag racing venues
Bristol, Tennessee
Buildings and structures in Sullivan County, Tennessee
Tourist attractions in Sullivan County, Tennessee
Tourist attractions in Bristol, Tennessee
1965 establishments in Tennessee
Sports venues completed in 1965